Ariadna Gutiérrez Arzaluz (born 22 August 1991) is a Mexican professional racing cyclist, who currently rides for UCI Women's Continental Team .

On 3 May 2019 she won the Pan American Road Cycling Championship. On 30 July 2019 she won the Mexican Road Race Championships in the category Elite.

Major results

2018
 2nd Road race, National Road Championships
 5th Overall Vuelta Internacional Femenina a Costa Rica
 8th Overall Vuelta a Colombia Femenina Oro y Paz
2019 
 1st  Road race, Pan American Road Championships
 2nd Road race, National Road Championships
2020
 10th Overall Women's Herald Sun Tour

References

External links

1991 births
Living people
Mexican female cyclists
Place of birth missing (living people)
Cyclists at the 2019 Pan American Games
Pan American Games competitors for Mexico
20th-century Mexican women
21st-century Mexican women